Sergey Skabelkin (Russian: Серге́й Серге́евич Скабе́лкин; born October 21, 1976) is an entrepreneur, expert in the banking sector, business architect of online banking. Skabelkin is an expert on the subject of blockchain technologies, cryptocurrency and regulations of crypto market, and the future of traditional banks. Skabelkin in an adviser on the ICO (Initial Coin Offering) launching, active mentor for FinTech startups, jury participant in numerous meet-ups and hackathons.

Education 
Skabelkin received secondary education in Kharkov, school No.82. He has two higher educations. In 1996, he graduated from The National Technical University "Kharkiv Polytechnic Institute" with the specialist degree in Chemical Technology of Refractory Non-Metallic and Silicate Materials. In 2005, he received the specialist degree in Intellectual Property from Ukrainian Engineering Pedagogics Academy (UEPA).

Career 
In 2002–2006, Skabelkin was a Member of The 24th Convocation of the Kominternovsky District Council of Kharkov from electoral district No. 29. Skabelkin was acknowledged for his activities by The School of Leader at the Kharkiv State Academy of Urban Economy Students Union, The Committee for Youth, Culture, Physical Education and Sports, The Center for Youth Social Services of the Kominternovsky District.

Sergey Skabelkin has successfully performed a large number of projects in the banking sector over the past 10 years. He has worked for such banks as:

2005-2007  KB Privat Bank (Privat Credit project)

2007-2008 Russian Standard Bank

2008-2009 Swedbank

2012 Smartfin CJSC (mPOS terminals 2CAN)

2013, 2014 Alfa Bank, carried out several projects for retail business

2013 Venture Fund "LifeFood" (LifePad project)

2013-2015 FidoBank PJSC (FidoWallet project).

Actively participated in creation and promotion of several FinTech startups in the mPOS field, the fields of contactless payments based on NFC HCE CBPP technology, loyalty programs and mobile wallets.

Sergey Scabelkin is a co-founder of FinTech Cluster based in Ukraine – venture hub, which set up as a non-profit organization with a view to develop Ukrainian IT ecosystem.
Since 2012 holds the position of vice-president at the Ukrainian E-Commerce Business Association.
Sergey Scabelkin created SkaCoin, operating on the Waves platform, – the first token secured by the individual consulting service.

Sergey Scabelkin is a regular speaker at international FinTech conferences.

Awards 
In 2007, Skabelkin was awarded the Order of Saint Nicholas the Wonderworker for his significant contribution to enhancing Ukrainian prestige in the world, from Ukrainian People's Embassy.

In 2016, he received the silver award for being an ‘Expert of the Year in the field of E-commerce and FinTech’ at the PaySpace Magazine Awards.

References 

1976 births
Living people
Russian bankers
Businesspeople from Kharkiv